Acraea pudorella is a butterfly in the family Nymphalidae. It is found in Angola, Zambia, Tanzania, the coast of Kenya and Malawi.

Description

A. pudorella Auriv. (55 d) is also very nearly allied to  Acraea caldarena, of which I formerly regarded it as only a seasonal form. Eltringham has, however, pointed out that discal dot 2 on the hindwing is placed nearer to the base of cellule 2 in pudorella than in caldarena  and that the male genitalia are differently formed. The type-form of pudorella further differs in having the forewing thinly scaled and entirely without the black apical spot. German and British East Africa; Abyssinia. -detecta Neave has a black apical spot 6 to 7 mm. in breadth on the upperside of the forewing and is consequently even more like caldarena. Rhodesia; Nyassaland and German East Africa.

Taxonomy
It is a member of the Acraea caecilia species group. See also Pierre & Bernaud, 2014.

References

External links

Die Gross-Schmetterlinge der Erde 13: Die Afrikanischen Tagfalter. Plate XIII 55 d
Images representing Acraea pudorella at Bold.

Butterflies described in 1899
pudorella
Butterflies of Africa
Taxa named by Per Olof Christopher Aurivillius